John Peto may refer to:
 John F. Peto, American trompe-l'œil painter
 John Peto (politician), British politician
 John Peto (cricketer), English cricketer